Ioan M. Manu, also known as Iancu Manu (1803 – November 29 O.S., 1874), was a Romanian boyar and politician.

Biography
He was the son of Mihail G. Manu, born into  a family of Venetian origins that had moved from Istanbul to Wallachia in the mid-18th century, where it was one of the noble families of Phanariotes. Ioan Manu studied at home and then at the Romanian school of Ion Heliade Rădulescu, Simeon Marcovici and others.

During the rule of Imperial Russian governor Pavel Kiselyov (see Regulamentul Organic), he was a prefect of Galaţi, then a prefect of Giurgiu and in 1833, he settled in the capital Bucharest, holding several offices in succession: a Vornic during the reign of Prince Alexandru II Ghica, a secretary of the National Assembly, and an Aga (prefect of police) during the reign of Gheorghe Bibescu (when he organized the first Firefighters' Corps in Wallachia). In exchange for his leadership during the Great Fire of Bucharest (1847), Manu was awarded a "sword of honour" by the city.

During the 1848 Wallachian Revolution, he fled the country, returning after some time, but staying out of politics for a while. He later became a Postelnic (Foreign Minister) during the reign of Barbu Dimitrie Ştirbei. In his political activity, Manu climbed all the boyar ranks, eventually reaching the highest one, that of Great Vornic.

In 1858, after the Crimean War removed the country from Russian overseeing, he was, with Emanoil Băleanu and Ioan Al. Filipescu, one of the three Caimacams who administered Wallachia pending the election of a new prince by the ad hoc Divan. In 1859, he supported the former prince Bibescu instead of Alexandru Ioan Cuza, and, during the latter's rule as Domnitor of the United Principalities, he retired from public life. Manu returned only when Carol I replaced Cuza, being elected a member of the Parliament of Romania in the first electoral college (that of landowners), as a representative of Ilfov County.

References
Dimitrie R. Rosetti, Dicţionarul contimporanilor, Editura Lito-Tipografiei "Populara", 1897

1803 births
1874 deaths
Regents and governors of Wallachia
Postelnici of Wallachia
Agas of the Wallachian police
History of Bucharest
Prefects of Romania
Members of the Chamber of Deputies (Romania)
Phanariotes
Romanian people of Greek descent